A symmetric relation is a type of binary relation. An example is the relation "is equal to", because if a = b is true then b = a is also true. Formally, a binary relation R over a set X is symmetric if:

where the notation  means that .

If RT represents the converse of R, then R is symmetric if and only if R = RT.

Symmetry, along with reflexivity and transitivity, are the three defining properties of an equivalence relation.

Examples

In mathematics
 "is equal to" (equality) (whereas "is less than" is not symmetric)
 "is comparable to", for elements of a partially ordered set
 "... and ... are odd":

Outside mathematics
 "is married to" (in most legal systems)
 "is a fully biological sibling of"
 "is a homophone of"
 "is co-worker of"
 "is teammate of"

Relationship to asymmetric and antisymmetric relations

By definition, a nonempty relation cannot be both symmetric and asymmetric (where if a is related to b, then b cannot be related to a (in the same way)). However, a relation can be neither symmetric nor asymmetric, which is the case for "is less than or equal to" and "preys on").

Symmetric and antisymmetric (where the only way a can be related to b and b be related to a is if a = b) are actually independent of each other, as these examples show.

Properties

A symmetric and transitive relation is always quasireflexive.

A symmetric, transitive, and reflexive relation is called an equivalence relation.

One way to count the symmetric relations on n elements, that in their binary matrix representation the upper right triangle determines the relation fully, and it can be arbitrary given, thus there are as many symmetric relations as nxn binary upper triangle matrices,

References

See also 

 
 
 

Binary relations